Kären Esther Wigen (born December 29, 1958) is an American historian, geographer, author and educator. She is a history professor at Stanford University.

Early life and education
Wigen was born in East Lansing, Michigan, United States. She graduated from University of Michigan in 1980, where she studied Japanese literature. She earned her doctorate at the University of California at Berkeley in geography in 1990.

Career
Wigen taught at Duke University beginning in 1990. Currently she is Frances and Charles Field Professor of History, Stanford University. She specializes in East Asia, and she teaches Japanese history and history of cartography.

Works
Wigen's first book, The Making of a Japanese Periphery, 1750-1920 (1995), explores southern Nagano Prefecture in Japan and how the silk industry transformed it. The Making of Japanese Periphery, 1750-1920 won the 1992 John K. Fairbank Prize of the American Historical Association.

She studied the same locality in her second book, A Malleable Map: Geographies of Restoration in Central Japan, 1600-1912 (2010), exploring the roles of cartography, chorography, and regionalism. A Malleable Map, wrote one reviewer, examines how "protoindustrial enterprises" such as sericulture and papercraft appeared on maps and reflected larger economic and political changes over roughly four centuries from the Tokugawa period through the Meiji period. Wigen focuses on how the relationship between regional and national identities "played an integral role in the creation of modern Japan". She argues that the pictorial and nonpictorial ways in which the geographical location of Shinano was shown redefined the ways in which people conceived of the place. These ways were "malleable" because they changed according to the needs and priorities of Tokugawa shoguns, merchants, Meiji officials, travelers, and scholars.

Her third book, The Myth of Continents: A Critique of Metageography (1997), co-authored with Martin Lewis, explains why the present system of classifying certain landmasses as "continents" is comparatively recent and derived more from historical accident and political concerns than from natural geographical features. Reviewers also generally welcomed The Myth of Continents. One noted that readers would find it a "useful volume" which dealt with Eurocentrism, Afrocentrism, Orientalism, postcolonial thought, and geographic education. Because it summarized classic and contemporary research, the volume was "an important stepping-stone between frequently obtuse, jargon-laden academic works on the one hand, and popular views of geography on the other."  Lewis and Wigen's concern is metageography, which they define as "the set of spatial structures through which people order their knowledge of the world" They find that geographies are "much more than just the ways in which societies are stretched across the earth's surface. They also include the contested, arbitrary, power-laden, and often inconsistent ways in which those structures are represented epistemologically."

The anthropologist Rita Kipp in reviewing the book wrote:

Kipp confessed "I found myself in a defensive mood during much of this book, and sometimes bored with what I thought I already knew about Eurocentrism, Orientalism, and the social construction of all scholarly categories and boundaries. The total effect, however, is finally arresting."

The geographical historian James M. Blaut, however, while praising the usefulness of the book, called it "pretentious" and their argument "rather conventional and indeed rather conservative." He especially criticized their use of the term "metageography": "the word metageography seems to have been coined by the authors as an impressive-sounding synonym for 'world cultural geography.'" This led to a forum in the Journal of World History, where Lewis and Wigen replied, and Blaut responded, "Perhaps I overemphasized the shortcomings; if I did so, it was because the tone of the book is more than a bit off-putting."

In April 2015, she delivered the Edwin O. Reischauer Lectures at Harvard University on the topic "Where in the World? Mapmaking at the Asia-Pacific Margin, 1600-1900."

Wigen's latest project is another collaboration, Cartographic Japan: A History in Maps, with co-editors Sugimoto Fumiko and Cary Karacas (forthcoming 2016).

List of major publications

Personal life
Wigen married Martin W. Lewis on August 13, 1983. They collaborated on the 1997 book, The Myth of Continents among other endeavors.

References

External links
Wigen, Kären 1958- WorldCat Authority Page.

1958 births
Stanford University faculty
American geographers
Living people
University of Michigan alumni